Philodoria marginestrigata, the ilima leaf miner, is a moth of the family Gracillariidae. It was first described by Lord Walsingham in 1907. It is endemic to the Hawaiian islands of Nihoa, Kauai, Oahu, Molokai and Hawaii.

The larvae feed on Dubautia species, Xanthium echinatum, Xanthium strumarium, Abutilon species (including Abutilon grandifolium, Abutilon incanum and Abutilon molle), Sida species (Sida cordifolia, Sida fallax, Sida meyeniana and Sida rhombifolia) and Datura species. They mine the leaves of their host plant. There may be as many as twelve mines in a single leaf, and the cocoon is made within the mine.

External links

Philodoria
Leaf miners
Endemic moths of Hawaii
Taxa named by Thomas de Grey, 6th Baron Walsingham
Moths described in 1907